Acacia stipulosa is a shrub of the genus Acacia and the subgenus Plurinerves that is endemic to the area of northern Australia.

Description
Like most species of Acacia it has phyllodes rather than true leaves. It blooms in July and produces yellow flowers. The simple inflorescences occur singly in the axils and have more or less spherical flower-heads with a diameter of  containing 30 to 40 golden coloured flowers.

Taxonomy
The species was first formally described by the botanist Ferdinand von Mueller in 1859 as a part of the work Contributiones ad Acaciarum Australiae Cognitionem as published in the Journal of the Proceedings of the Linnean Society.It was reclassified by Leslie Pedley in 1987 as Racosperma stipulosum then transferred back to genus Acacia in 2001.

Distribution
It is native to an area in the Northern Territory and Kimberley region of Western Australia where it found growing in sandy soils over sandstone. The range of the plant extends from the far easter Kimberley in the west to the upper area of the Victoria River near Winnecke Creek and near Gardiner Range in the northern Territory where it is often a part of shrubland or woodland communities.

See also
List of Acacia species

References

stipulosa
Acacias of Western Australia
Flora of the Northern Territory
Taxa named by Ferdinand von Mueller
Plants described in 1859